The 71st Primetime Emmy Awards honored the best in American prime time television programming from June 1, 2018, until May 31, 2019, as chosen by the Academy of Television Arts & Sciences. The ceremony was held on September 22, 2019, at the Microsoft Theater in Downtown Los Angeles, California, and was broadcast in the United States by Fox; it was preceded by the 71st Primetime Creative Arts Emmy Awards on September 14 and 15. The show did not have a host for the fourth time in its history, following the telecasts in 2003 (when the ceremony also aired on Fox), 1998 (on NBC), and 1975 (on CBS).

At the main ceremony, Fleabag led all programs with four wins and won the award for Outstanding Comedy Series. Game of Thrones won two awards, including its record-tying fourth win for Outstanding Drama Series. Chernobyl received the award for Outstanding Limited Series among its three wins. Other overall program awards went to Black Mirror: Bandersnatch, Last Week Tonight with John Oliver, RuPaul's Drag Race, and Saturday Night Live, while The Act, Barry, Fosse/Verdon, Killing Eve, The Marvelous Mrs. Maisel, Ozark, Pose, Succession, A Very English Scandal, and When They See Us each received at least one award. Including Creative Arts Emmys, Game of Thrones won 12 awards from 32 nominations – tying and breaking the single-season records, respectively – and helped HBO to 34 total wins, the most of any network. Watched by 6.9 million viewers in the United States, it was the lowest-rated Emmy broadcast in history, amounting to a 32% drop from the 2018 ceremony.

Winners and nominees 

The nominations were announced by D'Arcy Carden and Ken Jeong alongside Academy chairman and CEO Frank Scherma on July 16, 2019. Including its nominations at the 71st Primetime Creative Arts Emmy Awards, Game of Thrones established a new record for the most Emmy nominations received in a single year by any comedy or drama series with 32 nominations, breaking the record of 26 nominations set by NYPD Blue in 1994. Game of Thrones also extended its own record for most total nominations for a scripted series, ending with 161 nods across its eight-season run, and it finished tied for the second-most nominations for Outstanding Drama Series, its eight nominations trailing only Law & Orders 11. HBO returned to its status as the most-nominated network after being surpassed the previous year by Netflix, earning a record-setting 137 nominations to beat its own record from 2015. Pop TV received its first ever Emmy nominations, earning four nominations with Schitt's Creek.

The main ceremony was held on September 22. Fleabag led all shows with four wins, with Phoebe Waller-Bridge winning three of those for producing, writing, and acting on the show. Fleabags win for Outstanding Comedy Series gave Prime Video its second straight win in the category. The Marvelous Mrs. Maisel also performed well for Prime Video, tying its record of eight wins from the previous year between the main and Creative Arts ceremonies. British television shows such as Fleabag and Chernobyl had strong showings; according to Deadline Hollywood, 13 of 27 awards went to shows produced or co-produced by British individuals.

Game of Thrones broke or tied several records with its wins. Its fourth win for Outstanding Drama Series tied it with Hill Street Blues, L.A. Law, The West Wing, and Mad Men for most wins in the category. When including its Creative Arts wins, the show tied its own record for most Emmys won by a series in a single season with 12 awards, a feat it previously achieved in 2015 and 2016. It ended its run with 59 total Emmys, extending its record for most wins for a scripted series. Cast member Peter Dinklage established a new record for most wins for Outstanding Supporting Actor in a Drama Series with his fourth win and eighth nomination for the series.

For his role on Pose, Billy Porter made history as the first openly gay man to win Outstanding Lead Actor in a Drama Series. Jharrel Jerome became the first Afro-Latino to receive an Emmy for acting, winning Outstanding Lead Actor in a Limited Series or Movie for playing Korey Wise on When They See Us; he also became the youngest actor to win the category, at 21 years old. In the Outstanding Lead Actress in a Drama Series category, Jodie Comer became the youngest winner at 26 years old for her performance on Killing Eve.

Winners are listed first, highlighted in boldface, and indicated with a double dagger (‡). For simplicity, producers who received nominations for program awards, as well as nominated writers for Outstanding Writing for a Variety Series, have been omitted.

Programs 
{|class="wikitable"
|+ 
|-
| style="vertical-align:top;" width="50%" | 
 Fleabag (Prime Video) Barry (HBO)
 The Good Place (NBC)
 The Marvelous Mrs. Maisel (Prime Video)
 Russian Doll (Netflix)
 Schitt's Creek (Pop TV)
 Veep (HBO)
| style="vertical-align:top;" width="50%" | 
 Game of Thrones (HBO) Better Call Saul (AMC)
 Bodyguard (Netflix)
 Killing Eve (BBC America)
 Ozark (Netflix)
 Pose (FX)
 Succession (HBO)
 This Is Us (NBC)
|-
| style="vertical-align:top;" width="50%" | 
 Chernobyl (HBO) Escape at Dannemora (Showtime)
 Fosse/Verdon (FX)
 Sharp Objects (HBO)
 When They See Us (Netflix)
| style="vertical-align:top;" width="50%" | 
 Bandersnatch (Black Mirror) (Netflix) Brexit (HBO)
 Deadwood: The Movie (HBO)
 King Lear (Prime Video)
 My Dinner with Hervé (HBO)
|-
| style="vertical-align:top;" width="50%" | 
 Last Week Tonight with John Oliver (HBO) The Daily Show with Trevor Noah (Comedy Central)
 Full Frontal with Samantha Bee (TBS)
 Jimmy Kimmel Live! (ABC)
 The Late Late Show with James Corden (CBS)
 The Late Show with Stephen Colbert (CBS)
| style="vertical-align:top;" width="50%" | 
 Saturday Night Live (NBC) At Home with Amy Sedaris (truTV)
 Documentary Now! (IFC)
 Drunk History (Comedy Central)
 I Love You, America with Sarah Silverman (Hulu)
 Who Is America? (Showtime)
|-
| style="vertical-align:top;" width="50%" colspan="2" | 
 RuPaul's Drag Race (VH1)' The Amazing Race (CBS)
 American Ninja Warrior (NBC)
 Nailed It! (Netflix)
 Top Chef (Bravo)
 The Voice (NBC)
|}

 Acting 

 Lead performances 

 Supporting performances 

 Directing 

 Writing 

 Nominations and wins by program 
For the purposes of the lists below, "major" constitutes the categories listed above (program, acting, directing, and writing), while "total" includes the categories presented at the Creative Arts Emmy Awards.

 Nominations and wins by network 

 Presenters 
The awards were presented by the following people:

 Performers 

 Ceremony information 

The ceremony took place at the Microsoft Theater in Los Angeles with no host; comedian and actor Thomas Lennon served as an announcer for the ceremony, injecting with jokes and commentary as winners approached the stage to receive their Emmy. Televised by Fox, the ceremony began with a ruse where Homer Simpson appeared in an augmented-reality stage to host the event, before an animated piano dropped from the ceiling to land on The Simpsons' character. With the event now "host-less", Anthony Anderson rushed on stage in a skit where he insisted that "We’re going to go without a host tonight!" and pushed the first presenter Bryan Cranston to the stage to welcome the audience and introduce a montage of video clips. The ceremony continued in such fashion with only Lennon and montages and clips filling the time between presenters.

Several winners made notable "statement speeches" while accepting their awards. After winning the award for outstanding supporting actress in a comedy series for The Marvelous Mrs. Maisel, Alex Borstein said:

The winner for outstanding supporting actress in a limited series or movie, Patricia Arquette (The Act), in her acceptance speech said "I'm grateful at 50 to be getting the best parts of my life" and paid tribute to her sister, Alexis Arquette, who had died in 2016. Michelle Williams, after winning the award for outstanding lead actress in a limited series or movie for Fosse/Verdon, made references to the gender and racial wage gaps in the film industry, as well as the Time's Up movement:

In the In Memoriam presentation, a photograph of conductor Leonard Slatkin, who is alive and working in Ireland, was mistakenly used and captioned as André Previn, who died in February 2019.

 Category and rule changes 
On April 9, 2019, it was announced that American Horror Story: Apocalypse, the eighth season of the horror anthology series American Horror Story, and the second season of The Sinner would be ineligible for the Limited Series categories unlike their previous seasons, and instead be moved to Drama due to "continuing story threads, characters and actors reprising those same character roles from previous seasons", therefore making the series less fit for an anthology format. For similar reasons, the second season of American Vandal was moved from Limited Series to Comedy. None of the shows were nominated.

 Critical reviews and viewership 
The telecast was watched by 6.9 million viewers in the United States, making it the lowest-rated Emmy broadcast in history, amounting to a 32% drop from the 2018 ceremony.

 In Memoriam 
Halsey sang "Time After Time" by Cyndi Lauper and Rob Hyman. The following people were included in the In Memoriam'' presentation:

 John Singleton
 Doris Day
 Jan-Michael Vincent
 André Previn
 Cokie Roberts
 Sid Sheinberg
 Gloria Vanderbilt
 Tony Askins
 James Frawley
 Ron Miller
 Christopher Knopf
 Steve Golin
 Cameron Boyce
 Nancy Wilson
 Larry Siegel
 Peggy Lipton
 John Falsey
 Kristoff St. John
 Lou Weiss
 Sharon Taylor
 Roy Clark
 Tony Lynn
 Eunetta T. Boone
 Katherine Helmond
 Arte Johnson
 Tim Conway
 Tim Sullivan
 Rutger Hauer
 Sy Tomashoff
 Kevin Barnett
 Russell Kagan
 Seymour Cassel
 Bob Einstein
 Penny Marshall
 Georgia Engel
 Luke Perry
 Ken Berry
 Valerie Harper
 Peter Fonda
 Stan Lee
 Albert Finney
 Rip Torn
 Carol Channing

Notes

References

External links 
 Emmys.com list of 2019 Nominees & Winners
 Academy of Television Arts and Sciences website
 

071
2019 in American television
2019 in Los Angeles
2019 awards in the United States
2019 television awards
September 2019 events in the United States
2019 television specials
Television shows directed by Hamish Hamilton (director)